Limnohelina bivittata is a fly from the family Muscidae. It is found in New Zealand.

Description 
Malloch 1931 says, "This species is strikingly different from all the other NZ species in the group with four pairs of postsutural dorsocentral bristles, and two broad opaque black-brown vittae on the mesonotum which are divided by a paler central vitta. The lateral margins of mesonotum (are) densely greyish-white dusted. (The) upper third of frons velvety black and brown at anterior ocellus."

References 

Muscidae
Diptera of New Zealand
Insects described in 1931
Taxa named by John Russell Malloch